Bach to the Blues is an album performed by the Ramsey Lewis Trio that was recorded in 1964 and released on the Argo label.

Reception

Allmusic awarded the album 3 stars, with its review by Scott Yanow stating: "the group performs five original themes based on classical music, along with four blues-oriented tunes. Although a touch lightweight, the music is enjoyable enough and certainly superior to most of Lewis' output in the 1970s and '80s".

Track listing
All compositions by Ramsey Lewis except as indicated
 "For the Love of a Princess" - 3:48   
 "Why Don't You Do Right?" (Lil Green) - 4:20   
 "Misty Days, Lonely Nights" - 3:21   
 "Bach to the Blues" (Esmond Edwards) - 2:30   
 "Travel On" (Eldee Young) - 3:44   
 "Dance Mystique" - 5:30   
 "Sadness Done Come" - 3:52   
 "You'll Love Me Yet" - 3:06   
 "Peace and Tranquility" (Young) - 5:36

Personnel 
Ramsey Lewis - piano
Eldee Young - bass, cello
Richard Evans - bass (tracks 5 & 9)
Isaac "Red" Holt - drums

Classical Sources

 "For the Love of a Princess" - III.movement "The Young Prince and The Young Princess" from :Scheherazade (Rimsky-Korsakov) Op.35, :Nikolai Rimsky-Korsakov   
 "Misty Days, Lonely Nights" - :Vocalise (Rachmaninoff), :Sergei Rachmaninoff   
 "Bach to the Blues" - :Wachet auf, ruft uns die Stimme, BWV 140 (Sleepers Wake), :Johann Sebastian Bach  
 "Dance Mystique" - Coffee (Arabian Dance) from :The Nutcracker Suite Op.71a, :Pyotr Ilyich Tchaikovsky
 "You'll Love Me Yet" - :Johannes Brahms's Third Symphony in F Major, Op. 90, III. Poco allegretto (see also :Brahms's Third Symphony in popular culture)

References 

1964 albums
Ramsey Lewis albums
Argo Records albums
Albums produced by Esmond Edwards